Fiona Glascott (born 22 November 1982) is an Irish actress. She is best known for portraying a young Minerva McGonagall  in the Fantastic Beasts franchise, a spin-off of the Harry Potter film series.

Early life
Glascott was born in Waterford, Ireland and grew up in Carrick-on-Suir, County Tipperary.

Career

Theater
On stage in London she has appeared in Mahler's Conversion (Aldwych Theatre, West End), Hitchcock Blonde (Royal Court and Lyric Theatre, West End), in the original production of Whipping It Up at the Bush Theatre and as Margery Pinchwife in The Country Wife (Haymarket, West End). Her theatre credits in Dublin include: A Life (Abbey Theatre/National Tour), The Spirit of Annie Ross at the Gate Theatre and as Nina in The Seagull at the Corn Exchange.

Television
Her television credits include Ballykissangel, Fair City, The Bill, Bachelors Walk, Foyle's War and Clone. In 2010, she was a guest star in the final two-part episode of ITV's hit drama A Touch of Frost, playing the troubled daughter of Frost's one-time corrupt colleague. In 2011, Glascott appeared in the recurring role of Diane on the BBC/Showtime sitcom Episodes. That same year, she appeared as a novice nun with a secret in the episode "A Sacred Trust" of the detective drama series Midsomer Murders.

Film
On film, Glascott has appeared in This Is My Father, Crush Proof, Goldfish Memory, Omagh and The Duel. She appeared in the 2009 CBS television movie Miss Irena's Children. She also starred in Torstein Blixfjord's 2012 short film Bird in a Box, alongside Brian d'Arcy James.

In 2018, Glascott joined the cast of the Harry Potter spin-off franchise Fantastic Beasts as a young Minerva McGonagall (a role originated by Maggie Smith) in the film Fantastic Beasts: The Crimes of Grindelwald, a role she would reprise in the 2022 sequel Fantastic Beasts: The Secrets of Dumbledore. Her role in the film series was controversial for some fans of the series, as her character had not been believed to have been born yet and was shown in the film teaching at Hogwarts.

Personal life
In 2014, Glascott married actor Tom Brooke. They have one daughter.

Filmography

Awards
In 2003, Glascott was nominated for the Irish Film and Television Award for Best Supporting Actress in Film/TV for the film Goldfish Memory.

References

External links

1982 births
Living people
Irish film actresses
Irish soap opera actresses
Irish stage actresses
Irish television actresses
Irish expatriates in England
People from County Tipperary
People from County Waterford
20th-century Irish actresses
21st-century Irish actresses